The Anantapuramu–Hindupur Urban Development Authority (AHUDA) is an urban planning agency in Anantapur district of the Indian state of Andhra Pradesh. It was constituted on 4 November 2017, under Andhra Pradesh Metropolitan Region and Urban Development Authority Act, 2016 with the headquarters located at Anantapuramu.

Jurisdiction 
It covers 177 villages in 18 mandals of Anantapur district and newly formed Sri Sathya Sai district . Anantapuram is the only corporation and two other municipalities viz., Hindupur and Dharmavaram are also a part of AHUDA.

References

External links 
Official website

Anantapur district
Urban development authorities of Andhra Pradesh
State urban development authorities of India